Joseph Mallord William Turner  (23 April 177519 December 1851), known in his time as William Turner, was an English Romantic painter, printmaker and watercolourist. He is known for his expressive colouring, imaginative landscapes and turbulent, often violent marine paintings. He left behind more than 550 oil paintings, 2,000 watercolours, and 30,000 works on paper. He was championed by the leading English art critic John Ruskin from 1840, and is today regarded as having elevated landscape painting to an eminence rivalling history painting.

Turner was born in Maiden Lane, Covent Garden, London, to a modest lower-middle-class family and retained his working class accent and assiduously avoiding the trappings of success and fame. A child prodigy, Turner studied at the Royal Academy of Arts from 1789, enrolling when he was 14, and exhibited his first work there at 15. During this period, he also served as an architectural draftsman. He earned a steady income from commissions and sales, which due to his troubled, contrary nature, were often begrudgingly accepted. He opened his own gallery in 1804 and became professor of perspective at the academy in 1807, where he lectured until 1828. He travelled around Europe from 1802, typically returning with voluminous sketchbooks.

Intensely private, eccentric and reclusive, Turner was a controversial figure throughout his career. He did not marry, but fathered two daughters, Evelina (1801–1874) and Georgiana (1811–1843), by his housekeeper Sarah Danby. He became more pessimistic and morose as he got older, especially after the death of his father, when his outlook deteriorated, his gallery fell into disrepair and neglect, and his art intensified. In 1841, Turner rowed a boat into the Thames so he could not be counted as present at any property in that year's census. He lived in squalor and poor health from 1845, and died in London in 1851 aged 76. Turner is buried in St Paul's Cathedral, London.

Biography

Childhood 

Turner's father William Turner (1745-1829)  moved to London around 1770 from South Molton, Devon.

Joseph Mallord William Turner was born on 23 April 1775 and baptised on 14 May. He was born in Maiden Lane, Covent Garden, in London, England. His father William Turner  was a barber and wig maker. His mother, Mary Marshall, came from a family of butchers. A younger sister, Mary Ann, was born in September 1778 but died in August 1783.

Turner's mother showed signs of mental disturbance from 1785 and was admitted to St Luke's Hospital for Lunatics in Old Street in 1799. She was moved in 1800 to Bethlem Hospital, a mental asylum, where she died in 1804. Turner was sent to his maternal uncle, Joseph Mallord William Marshall, a butcher in Brentford, then a small town on the banks of the River Thames west of London, where Turner attended school. The earliest known artistic exercise by Turner is from this period—a series of simple colourings of engraved plates from Henry Boswell's Picturesque View of the Antiquities of England and Wales.

Around 1786, Turner was sent to Margate on the north-east Kent coast. There he produced a series of drawings of the town and surrounding area that foreshadowed his later work. By this time, Turner's drawings were being exhibited in his father's shop window and sold for a few shillings. His father boasted to the artist Thomas Stothard that: "My son, sir, is going to be a painter". In 1789, Turner again stayed with his uncle who had retired to Sunningwell (now part of Oxfordshire). A whole sketchbook of work from this time in Berkshire survives as well as a watercolour of Oxford. The use of pencil sketches on location, as the foundation for later finished paintings, formed the basis of Turner's essential working style for his whole career.

Many early sketches by Turner were architectural studies or exercises in perspective, and it is known that, as a young man, he worked for several architects including Thomas Hardwick, James Wyatt and Joseph Bonomi the Elder. By the end of 1789, he had also begun to study under the topographical draughtsman Thomas Malton, who specialised in London views. Turner learned from him the basic tricks of the trade, copying and colouring outline prints of British castles and abbeys. He would later call Malton "My real master". Topography was a thriving industry by which a young artist could pay for his studies.

Career 

Turner entered the Royal Academy of Art in 1789, aged 14, and was accepted into the academy a year later by Sir Joshua Reynolds. He  showed an early interest in architecture, but was advised by Hardwick to focus on painting. His first watercolour, A View of the Archbishop's Palace, Lambeth was accepted for the Royal Academy summer exhibition of 1790 when Turner was 15.

As an academy probationer, Turner was taught drawing from plaster casts of antique sculptures. From July 1790 to October 1793, his name appears in the registry of the academy over a hundred times. In June 1792, he was admitted to the life class to learn to draw the human body from nude models. Turner exhibited watercolours each year at the academy while painting in the winter and travelling in the summer widely throughout Britain, particularly to Wales, where he produced a wide range of sketches for working up into studies and watercolours. These particularly focused on architectural work, which used his skills as a draughtsman. In 1793, he showed the watercolour titled The Rising Squall – Hot Wells from St Vincent's Rock Bristol (now lost), which foreshadowed his later climatic effects. The British writer Peter Cunningham, in his obituary of Turner, wrote that it was: "recognised by the wiser few as a noble attempt at lifting landscape art out of the tame insipidities...[and] evinced for the first time that mastery of effect for which he is now justly celebrated".

In 1796, Turner exhibited Fishermen at Sea, his first oil painting for the academy, of a nocturnal moonlit scene of the Needles off the Isle of Wight, an image of boats in peril. Wilton said that the image was "a summary of all that had been said about the sea by the artists of the 18th century". and shows strong influence by artists such as Claude Joseph Vernet, Philip James de Loutherbourg, Peter Monamy and Francis Swaine, who was admired for his moonlight marine paintings. The image was praised by contemporary critics and founded Turner's reputation as both an oil painter and a painter of maritime scenes.

Turner travelled widely in Europe, starting with France and Switzerland in 1802 and studying in the Louvre in Paris in the same year. He made many visits to Venice. Important support for his work came from Walter Ramsden Fawkes of Farnley Hall, near Otley in Yorkshire, who became a close friend of the artist. Turner first visited Otley in 1797, aged 22, when commissioned to paint watercolours of the area. He was so attracted to Otley and the surrounding area that he returned to it throughout his career. The stormy backdrop of Hannibal Crossing The Alps is reputed to have been inspired by a storm over the Chevin in Otley while he was staying at Farnley Hall.

Turner was a frequent guest of George O'Brien Wyndham, 3rd Earl of Egremont, at Petworth House in West Sussex and painted scenes that Egremont funded taken from the grounds of the house and of the Sussex countryside, including a view of the Chichester Canal. Petworth House still displays a number of paintings.

Later life 
As Turner grew older, he became more eccentric. He had few close friends except for his father, who lived with him for 30 years and worked as his studio assistant. His father's death in 1829 had a profound effect on him, and thereafter he was subject to bouts of depression. He never married but had a relationship with an older widow, Sarah Danby. He is believed to have been the father of her two daughters Evelina Dupuis and Georgiana Thompson. Evelina married Joseph Dupuis on 31 October 1817. It was recorded that her mother, Sarah Danby, was a witness along with Charles Thompson.

Turner formed a relationship with Sophia Caroline Booth  after her second husband died, and from 1846 he lived with her as "Mr Booth" or "Admiral Booth" in her house at 6 Davis's Place (now Cheyne Walk) in Chelsea, until his death in December 1851.

Turner was a habitual user of snuff; in 1838, Louis Philippe I, King of the French presented a gold snuff box to him. Of two other snuffboxes, an agate and silver example bears Turner's name, and another, made of wood, was collected along with his spectacles, magnifying glass and card case by an associate housekeeper.

Turner formed a short but intense friendship with the artist Edward Thomas Daniell. The painter David Roberts wrote of him that, "He adored Turner, when I and others doubted, and taught me to see & to distinguish his beauties over that of others ... the old man really had a fond & personal regard for this young clergyman, which I doubt he ever evinced for the other". Daniell may have supplied Turner with the spiritual comfort he needed after the deaths of his father and friends, and to "ease the fears of a naturally reflective man approaching old age". After Daniell's death in Lycia at the age of 38, he told Roberts he would never form such a friendship again.

Before leaving for the Middle East, Daniell commissioned his portrait from John Linnell. Turner had previously refused to sit for the artist, and it was difficult to get his agreement to be portrayed. Daniell positioned the two men opposite each other at dinner, so that Linnell could observe his subject carefully and portray his likeness from memory.

Turner died of cholera at the home of Sophia Caroline Booth, in Cheyne Walk in Chelsea, on 19 December 1851. He is buried in St Paul's Cathedral, where he lies near the painter Sir Joshua Reynolds. Apparently his last words were "The Sun (or Son?) is God", though this may be apocryphal.

Turner's friend, the architect Philip Hardwick, the son of his old tutor, was in charge of making the funeral arrangements and wrote to those who knew Turner to tell them at the time of his death that, "I must inform you, we have lost him." Other executors were his cousin and chief mourner at the funeral, Henry Harpur IV (benefactor of Westminster – now Chelsea & Westminster – Hospital), Revd. Henry Scott Trimmer, George Jones RA and Charles Turner ARA.

Art

Style 
Turner's talent was recognised early in his life. Financial independence allowed Turner to innovate freely; his mature work is characterised by a chromatic palette and broadly applied atmospheric washes of paint. According to David Piper's The Illustrated History of Art, his later pictures were called "fantastic puzzles". Turner was recognised as an artistic genius; the English art critic John Ruskin described him as the artist who could most "stirringly and truthfully measure the moods of Nature". Turner's work drew criticism from contemporaries, in particular from Sir George Beaumont, a landscape painter and fellow member of the Royal Academy, who described his paintings as "blots".

Turner's imagination was sparked by shipwrecks, fires (including the burning of Parliament in 1834, an event which Turner witnessed first-hand, and transcribed in a series of watercolour sketches), and natural phenomena such as sunlight, storm, rain, and fog. He was fascinated by the violent power of the sea, as seen in Dawn after the Wreck (1840) and The Slave Ship (1840).

Turner's major venture into printmaking was the Liber Studiorum (Book of Studies), seventy prints that he worked on from 1806 to 1819. The Liber Studiorum was an expression of his intentions for landscape art. The idea was loosely based on Claude Lorrain's Liber Veritatis (Book of Truth), where Claude had recorded his completed paintings; a series of print copies of these drawings, by then at Devonshire House, had been a huge publishing success.  Turner's plates were meant to be widely disseminated, and categorised the genre into six types: Marine, Mountainous, Pastoral, Historical, Architectural, and Elevated or Epic Pastoral. His printmaking was a major part of his output, and a museum is devoted to it, the Turner Museum in Sarasota, Florida, founded in 1974 by Douglass Montrose-Graem to house his collection of Turner prints.

His early works, such as Tintern Abbey (1795), stay true to the traditions of English landscape. In Hannibal Crossing the Alps (1812), an emphasis on the destructive power of nature has already come into play. His distinctive style of painting, in which he used watercolour technique with oil paints, created lightness, fluency, and ephemeral atmospheric effects.

In Turner's later years, he used oils ever more transparently and turned to an evocation of almost pure light by use of shimmering colour. A prime example of his mature style can be seen in Rain, Steam and Speed – The Great Western Railway, where the objects are barely recognisable. The intensity of hue and interest in evanescent light not only placed Turner's work in the vanguard of English painting but exerted an influence on art in France; the Impressionists, particularly Claude Monet, carefully studied his techniques. He is also generally regarded as a precursor of abstract painting.

High levels of volcanic ash (from the eruption of Mount Tambora) in the atmosphere during 1816, the "Year Without a Summer", led to unusually spectacular sunsets during this period, and were an inspiration for some of Turner's work.

John Ruskin said that an early patron, Thomas Monro, Principal Physician of Bedlam, and a collector and amateur artist, was a significant influence on Turner's style:

His true master was Dr Monro; to the practical teaching of that first patron and the wise simplicity of method of watercolour study, in which he was disciplined by him and companioned by his friend Girtin, the healthy and constant development of the greater power is primarily to be attributed; the greatness of the power itself, it is impossible to over-estimate.

Together with a number of young artists, Turner was able, in Monro's London house, to copy works of the major topographical draughtsmen of his time and perfect his skills in drawing. But the curious atmospherical effects and illusions of John Robert Cozens's watercolours, some of which were present in Monro's house, went far further than the neat renderings of topography. The solemn grandeur of his Alpine views were an early revelation to the young Turner and showed him the true potential of the watercolour medium, conveying mood instead of information.

Materials 
Turner experimented with a wide variety of pigments. He used formulations like carmine, despite knowing that they were not long-lasting, and against the advice of contemporary experts to use more durable pigments. As a result, many of his colours have now faded. Ruskin complained at how quickly his work decayed; Turner was indifferent to posterity and chose materials that looked good when freshly applied. By 1930, there was concern that both his oils and his watercolours were fading.

Gallery

Legacy 
Turner left a small fortune which he hoped would be used to support what he called "decayed artists". He planned an almshouse at Twickenham in west London with a gallery for some of his works. His will was contested and in 1856, after a court battle, his first cousins, including Thomas Price Turner, received part of his fortune. Another portion went to the Royal Academy of Arts, which occasionally awards students the Turner Medal. His finished paintings were bequeathed to the British nation, and he intended that a special gallery would be built to house them. This did not happen due to disagreement over the final site. Twenty-two years after his death, the British Parliament passed an act allowing his paintings to be lent to museums outside London, and so began the process of scattering the pictures which Turner had wanted to be kept together.

One of the greatest collectors of his work was Henry Vaughan, who when he died in 1899 owned more than one hundred watercolours and drawings by Turner and as many prints. His collection included examples of almost every type of work on paper the artist produced, from early topographical drawings and atmospheric landscape watercolours, to brilliant colour studies, literary vignette illustrations and spectacular exhibition pieces. It included nearly a hundred proofs of Liber Studiorum and twenty-three drawings connected with it. It was an unparalleled collection that comprehensively represented the diversity, imagination and technical inventiveness of Turner's work throughout his sixty-year career. Vaughan bequeathed the most of his Turner collection to British and Irish public galleries and museums, stipulating that the collections of Turner's watercolours should be 'exhibited to the public all at one time, free of charge and only in January', demonstrating an awareness of conservation which was unusual at the time.

In 1910, the main part of the Turner Bequest, which includes unfinished paintings and drawings, was rehoused in the Duveen Turner Wing at the National Gallery of British Art (now Tate Britain). In 1987, a new wing at the Tate, the Clore Gallery, was opened to house the Turner bequest, though some of the most important paintings remain in the National Gallery in contravention of Turner's condition that they be kept and shown together. Increasingly paintings are lent abroad, ignoring Turner's provision that they remain constantly and permanently in Turner's Gallery.

St. Mary's Church, Battersea added a commemorative stained glass window for Turner, between 1976 and 1982. St Paul's Cathedral, Royal Academy of Arts and the Victoria & Albert Museum all hold statues representing him. A portrait by Cornelius Varley with his patent graphic telescope (Sheffield Museums & Galleries) was compared with his death mask (National Portrait Gallery, London) by Kelly Freeman at Dundee University 2009–10 to ascertain whether it really depicts Turner. The City of Westminster unveiled a memorial plaque at the site of his birthplace at 21 Maiden Lane, Covent Garden, on 2 June 1999.

Selby Whittingham founded The Turner Society at London and Manchester in 1975. After the society endorsed the Tate Gallery's Clore Gallery wing (on the lines of the Duveen wing of 1910), as the solution to the controversy of what should be done with the Turner Bequest, Selby Whittingham resigned and founded the Independent Turner Society. The Tate created the prestigious annual Turner Prize art award in 1984, named in Turner's honour, and 20 years later the Royal Institute of Painters in Water Colours founded the Winsor & Newton Turner Watercolour Award. A major exhibition, "Turner's Britain", with material (including The Fighting Temeraire) on loan from around the globe, was held at Birmingham Museum and Art Gallery from 7 November 2003 to 8 February 2004. In 2005, Turner's The Fighting Temeraire was voted Britain's "greatest painting" in a public poll organised by the BBC.

Portrayal
Leo McKern played Turner in The Sun Is God, a 1974 Thames Television production directed by Michael Darlow. The programme aired on 17 December 1974, during the Turner Bicentenary Exhibition in London. British filmmaker Mike Leigh wrote and directed Mr. Turner, a biopic of Turner's later years, released in 2014. The film starred Timothy Spall as Turner, Dorothy Atkinson, Marion Bailey and Paul Jesson, and premiered in competition for the Palme d'Or at the 2014 Cannes Film Festival, with Spall taking the award for Best Actor.

The Bank of England announced that a portrait of Turner, with a backdrop of The Fighting Temeraire, would appear on the £20 note beginning in 2020. It is the first £20 British banknote printed on polymer. It came into circulation on Thursday 20 February 2020.

See also 
 List of paintings by J. M. W. Turner

Explanatory notes

Citations

General and cited sources

Further reading

External links 

 
 
 The Turner Society
 Turner & the 1834 Parliament Fire – UK Parliament Living Heritage
 Christie's Videos – Giudecca, La Donna della Salute and San Giorgio Joseph Mallord William Turner, RA
 Sotheby's Videos – The Temple of Jupiter Panellenius Joseph Mallord William Turner, RA
 Sotheby's Videos – Modern Rome Campo Vaccino and The condition of Modern Rome, Campo Vaccino J. M. W. Turner, RA
 J.M.W. Turner exhibition catalogs
 Web site of the Tate Turner Collection, includes the "Turner Bequest" of over 300 Oil paintings and over 30,000 sketches. The catalogue holds records of over 40,000 works by Turner
 
 
 A Brief History of Abstract Art with Turner, Mondrian and More
 "Turner's Whaling Pictures", The Metropolitan Museum of Art Bulletin, v. 73, no. 4 (Spring, 2016)
 
 , engraved by Edward Goodall for Fisher's Drawing Room Scrap Book, 1839, with a poetical illustration by Letitia Elizabeth Landon.

 
1775 births
1851 deaths
18th-century English male artists
19th-century English male artists
18th-century English painters
19th-century English painters
British marine artists
British landscape painters
Burials at St Paul's Cathedral
Deaths from cholera
English landscape painters
English male painters
English printmakers
English romantic painters
English watercolourists
People from Covent Garden
Rother Valley artists
Royal Academicians
Tate galleries
British erotic artists